Trinchesia ocellata is a species of sea slug, an aeolid nudibranch, a marine gastropod mollusc in the family Trinchesiidae.

Distribution
This species was described from the Gulf of Naples, Italy. It has been recorded on the coasts of the Mediterranean Sea from Italy to Spain.

Ecology
Trinchesia ocellata is found on a number of colonial hydroids including Sertularella and Halecium labrosum.

References 

 Gofas, S.; Le Renard, J.; Bouchet, P. (2001). Mollusca. in: Costello, M.J. et al. (eds), European Register of Marine Species: a check-list of the marine species in Europe and a bibliography of guides to their identification. Patrimoines Naturels. 50: 180-213

External links
 Ortea J., Moro L., Bacallado J.J. & Sanchez J.J. (2008) Nuevas aportaciones a la fauna de opistobranquios (Mollusca: Gasteropoda) de las islas Canarias. Vieraea 36: 129-136

Trinchesiidae
Gastropods described in 1966